Philbert Duncan Blair (born 30 October 1943) is a former Guyanese cricketer who played first-class cricket from 1968 to 1974. He toured with the West Indian cricket team in England in 1969 but did not play Test cricket.

A fast bowler, Philbert Blair made his first-class debut for Guyana in 1967–68. When the West Indies Test team were away touring Australia and New Zealand in 1968-69 he was the leading wicket-taker in the Shell Shield, with 23 wickets at an average of 21.26. He took 5 for 60 against Jamaica and 5 for 63 against Trinidad.

He was one of the four inexperienced pace bowlers chosen for the 1969 tour, alongside Vanburn Holder, John Shepherd and Grayson Shillingford, none of whom had played Test cricket. Blair played only nine of the 19 first-class matches, taking 14 wickets at 36.35, and the other three pace bowlers were preferred for the Tests. Colin Babb reports that some people considered Blair to be the most promising and quickest of the young pace attack, but says that Basil Butcher reported that he was passed over for selection because of questions about his action. In the one-day match against Ireland, West Indies were 12 for 9 before Blair joined Shillingford to raise the final total to 25.

Blair continued to play for Guyana with moderate success until the end of the 1973–74 season.

References

External links
 Philbert Blair at Cricket Archive
 Philbert Blair at Cricinfo

1943 births
Living people
Sportspeople from Georgetown, Guyana
Guyanese cricketers
Guyana cricketers
Demerara cricketers